S.S.D. Notaresco calcio 1924 or simply Notaresco is an Italian association football club. It is based in Notaresco, Teramo, Abruzzo. The club competes in Serie D Group F.

History 

The club was founded in 1924 as A.S. Notaresco Calcio. It mainly played in Eccellenza Abruzzo and Promozione, but on several occasions such as the 2006/2007 season, it came close to getting promotion to Serie D. Notaresco Calcio won the Coppa Dilettanti Abruzzo two times, in 1999 and in 2001. After the 2016/2017 season, it was relegated to Prima Categoria, but the club didn't subrscibe for the next season.

In 2018, in accordance with Notaresco's mayor (Diego Di Bonaventura), the club San Nicolò Calcio (founded in 1968 as “A.C. San Nicolò” , in the 2010–11 season won the Eccellenza Abruzzo, obtaining promotion to Serie D. Its ascent started in Prima Categoria in the 2002–03 season) and was relocated to Notaresco; changing its name to S.N. Notaresco.

In 2022, the club rechanged its name to Notaresco Calcio 1924, its original name.

Colors and badge 

The team's color are red and blue. The team's mascot is a bull, matching the Notaresco municipality coat of arms.

Current squad

References

External links 
Official Site

Football clubs in Abruzzo
Association football clubs established in 1968
1968 establishments in Italy